The 1969–70 Liga Alef season saw Hapoel Hadera (champions of the North Division) and Hapoel Holon (champions of the South Division) win the title and promotion to Liga Leumit.

North Division

South Division

References
Liga Alef table - North Davar, 24.5.70, Historical Jewish Press 
Hapoel Holon beat Amidar 2:1 - and promoted to Liga Leumit Davar, 31.5.70, Historical Jewish Press 
Previous seasons The Israel Football Association 

Liga Alef seasons
Israel
2